Banks Peninsula is a New Zealand parliamentary electorate which initially existed from 1996 to 2008, and was later recreated in 2020 ahead of the 2020 election. It was held by National's David Carter for the initial term, and then by Labour's Ruth Dyson from 1999 to 2008. The seat is currently held by Labour's Tracey McLellan.

Population centres
The Banks Peninsula electorate, as defined in 2020, includes some of southern Christchurch, with suburbs such as Oaklands, Somerfield, Cashmere, Woolston, Halswell, Heathcote, and Sumner. It also includes some towns immediately south of Christchurch such as Lyttelton, and all of Banks Peninsula itself including the town of Akaroa.

History
The 1996 election was notable for the significant change of electorate boundaries, based on the provisions of the Electoral Act 1993. Because of the introduction of the mixed-member proportional (MMP) electoral system, the number of electorates had to be reduced, leading to significant changes. More than half of the electorates contested in 1996 were newly constituted, and most of the remainder had seen significant boundary changes. In total, 73 electorates were abolished, 29 electorates were newly created (including Banks Peninsula), and 10 electorates were recreated, giving a net loss of 34 electorates. Banks Peninsula replaced the previous Lyttelton electorate.

In boundary changes for the 2008 general election, the electorate lost its rural population centres to the newly formed Selwyn, and became a solely urban electorate that was renamed Port Hills. Labour's Ruth Dyson retained Port Hills for all four elections with a greater lead than she had seen for Banks Peninsula. Dyson is not seeking reelection in 2020.

In the boundary review of 2019/2020, the Representation Commission decided to make large changes to the boundaries of Port Hills, taking area in Halswell and parts of Bromley out and adding Banks Peninsula in, to manage large changes in population in the Christchurch and  areas. The electorate was also re-recreated as Banks Peninsula. At its first election, the electorate was won easily by Labour's Tracey McLellan amidst the nationwide Labour landslide.

Members of Parliament

Key

List MPs

Election results

2020 election

2005 election

2002 election

 
 
 
 

a United Future swing is compared to the combined 1999 results of United NZ and Future NZ, who merged in 2000.

1999 election

1996 election

References

External links
Electorate Profile  Parliamentary Library
Electorate Map from Elections NZ

Historical electorates of New Zealand
1996 establishments in New Zealand
2008 disestablishments in New Zealand
2020 establishments in New Zealand